The Turkish basketball league system or Turkish basketball league pyramid, is a series of interconnected competitions for professional basketball clubs in Turkey. The system has a hierarchical format with a promotion and demotion system between competitions at different levels. There are currently five different competitions on the pyramid: the 1st-tier Turkish Basketball Super League (BSL), the 2nd-tier Turkish Basketball First League (TBL), the 3rd-tier Turkish Basketball Second League (TB2L), the 4th-tier Turkish Men's Regional Basketball League (EBBL), and the 5th-tier Men's University League (Ünilig).

The tier pyramid

Other competitions
Turkish Basketball Cup
Turkish President's Cup

See also
League system
European professional club basketball system
Spanish basketball league system
Greek basketball league system
Italian basketball league system
French basketball league system
Russian basketball league system
German basketball league system
Serbian basketball league system
Polish basketball league system
Hungarian basketball league system
South American professional club basketball system

References

External links
Eurobasket.com Turkish Men's Basketball
Turkish Basketball Super League Official Website 
Turkish Basketball Federation Official Website 
Turkish Basketball Federation Official Website 

Basketball league systems